Alphonsus Celestine Edmund Cassell MBE (16 November 1949 – 15 September 2010) was a Montserratian calypso and soca musician, regarded as the first superstar of soca from Montserrat. He performed under the stage name Arrow. Internationally, his biggest hit song was "Hot Hot Hot" (1982), known from the original by Arrow and numerous later versions by other musicians.

Early years
Cassell first performed at the age of 10 in a concert at the Montserrat Secondary School. He began singing calypso in 1967 and took the Junior Monarch title that year. 

Cassell took up singing professionally in 1969. That year he was runner up in the Montserrat Calypso King competition. He won the title the following year, following in the footsteps of his brothers Justin (known as Hero) and Lorenzo (known as Young Challenger). He took the title a total of four times.

Career

He released his first album Arrow on Target in the summer of 1971, two singles in mid 1972, "Dance with me woman", and "Jean under the bed." In 1972 November he released his second album.. Arrow strikes again...  His third album was released in 1975. Ed Watson served as arranger for these first three albums. Arrow recorded five more albums with Watson before he started working with Leston Paul.

Cassell began to fuse calypso with other genres such as Zouk, R&B, and salsa. This resulted in some criticism and accusations that he was destroying Montserrat's calypso traditions. Others argued that his updating of the genre brought it to a new audience.

In 1982, Cassell began collaborating with arranger Leston Paul and recorded "Hot Hot Hot". This was his biggest hit and it became the biggest selling soca hit of all time. "Hot Hot Hot" was composed by Arrow's brother, Justin 'Hero' Cassell. The song was adopted as the theme song of the 1986 FIFA World Cup in Mexico, and was later covered by Buster Poindexter, Menudo, and Babla & Kanchan.

Arrow capitalised on this success with 1983's Heat album, and the "Rub Up" single, and 1984's Soca Savage album, from which the international hit "Long Time" was taken, a top 30 hit in the United Kingdom. He enjoyed further chart success in the UK with a remixed version of "Hot Hot Hot", which reached number 38 (the original had stalled at number 58). By this time, Arrow was also incorporating Latin brass into his music. Subsequent albums also saw the incorporation of merengue (1986's Heavy Energy), and rock (1988's Knock Dem Dead). Heavy Energy was his first album for Island Records' Mango label, with two further albums released on the label.

Cassell established himself as a businessman in Montserrat in 1973, owning the Arrow's Manshop store in Plymouth. When this was destroyed by the Soufriere Hills volcanic eruption, he relocated to St. John's, Antigua. He organised a fund-raising calypso festival on the island in 1996, in response to the devastation caused by the volcano.

Cassell co-headlined Bermuda's Soca '96 festival, and continued to regularly release albums. In 1988, he was given the Living Legends award by the organizers of the Caribbean Song Festival and the Bahamas Tourist Board.

Cassell continued to be much in demand in the Caribbean. He performed at the Cricket World Cup 2007 opening ceremonies with Shaggy, Byron Lee and Kevin Lyttle. His last performance was at a fund-raising concert for Haiti at the Montserrat Cultural Center in January 2010.

Death

Cassell died peacefully at home in Montserrat with his family at his side, on 15 September 2010, after battling cerebral cancer for two years.

Discography

Albums
The Mighty Arrow on Target (1972)
Arrow Strikes Again (1973)
Keep on Jamming (1975)
Sweet Beat (1978)
Instant Knockout (1980)
Man From Africa (1980)
Double Trouble (1981)
Hot Hot Hot (1982)
Heat (1983)
Soca Savage (1984)
Deadly (1985)
Heavy Energy (1986)
Soca Explosion (1987)
Knock Dem Dead (1988)
Massive (1988)
O'La Soca (1989)
Soca Dance Party (1990)
Hot Soca Hot (1990)
Zombie Soca (1991)
Zombie Remixes (1991)
The Best of Arrow Volume 2 (1992)
Model De Bam Bam (1992)
Outrageous (1993)
Classics (1994)
Phat (1995)
Ride De Riddim (1996)
Turbulence (1998)
Beat De Drum (2000)
Arrow – Vintage Volume 1 (2002)
No Rules (2002)

Singles
1973: "Dance with Me, Woman"
1981: "Soca Rhumba" / B-side "Bills"
1982: "Curacao" / B-side "Bills"
1983: "Rub Up"
1983: "Hot Hot Hot" No. 59 UK / B-side "Money"
1984: "Long Time" No. 30 UK / B-side "Colombia Rock"
1987: "Hurray Hurray" / B-side "Wanna Dance"
1988: "Groove Master" No. 23 US Dance
1989: "O' La Soca" No. 38 US Dance
1994: "Hot Hot Hot (World Carnival Mix '94)" No. 38 UK, No.9 Australia

References

Further reading
De Ledesma, Charles and Georgia Popplewell. "Put Water in the Brandy?"". 2000.  In Broughton, Simon and Ellingham, Mark with McConnachie, James and Duane, Orla (Ed.), World Music, Vol. 2: Latin & North America, Caribbean, India, Asia and Pacific, pp 507–526. Rough Guides Ltd, Penguin Books.

External links
Alphonsus Cassell bio
Norman 'Gus' Thomas (6 August 2004) Soca Superstar Arrow Among Honourees In Antigua.
Obituaries from The Guardian and The Independent newspapers.

1949 births
2010 deaths
Members of the Order of the British Empire
Calypsonians
Island Records artists
Chrysalis Records artists
Montserratian musicians
Deaths from brain tumor
Soca musicians